Even Barli (born 24 July 1991) is a former Norwegian footballer.

Career
Barli was reserve goalkeeper in Rosenborg from 2009 to 2011, but did not play a single game there, so in 2012 he transferred to Ranheim.

Barli made his debut for Ranheim in starting 11 in a 3-1 win in an OBOS-ligaen game against Tromsdalen.

After the 2020 season Barli decide to retire to focus on his family and day job.

Career statistics

References

1991 births
Living people
People from Verdal
Norwegian footballers
Rosenborg BK players
Ranheim Fotball players
Norwegian First Division players
Eliteserien players
Association football goalkeepers
Norway youth international footballers
Sportspeople from Trøndelag